Nadia Yassine (born December 1958) is the head of the women's branch of the Moroccan Islamist movement Al Adl Wa Al Ihssane (Justice and Spirituality). Born in Casablanca, Morocco, she is the daughter of the founder of the same organization Cheikh Abdesslam Yassine.

References

Bibliography
 Toutes voiles dehors, Le Fennec, 2003 , translated as Full sails ahead by Farouk Bouasse, 2006, 
 Le silence de Shahrazade

External links
 Official website
 Chaykh Abdessalam Yassine official website

People from Casablanca
1958 births
Living people
Moroccan writers
Al Adl Wa Al Ihssane politicians
21st-century Moroccan women politicians
21st-century Moroccan politicians